Einar Valur Kristjánsson (16 August 1934 – 7 September 1996) was an Icelandic alpine skier. He competed in two events at the 1956 Winter Olympics. He also played football for ÍBÍ and Víkingur Reykjavík.

Personal life
Kristjánsson's son, Atli Einarsson, was a member of the Icelandic national football team between 1990 and 1992, and won the Icelandic football championship in 1991 as a member of Víkingur Reykjavík.

References

External links
 

1934 births
1996 deaths
Alpine skiers at the 1956 Winter Olympics
Einar Kristjansson
Einar Kristjansson
Einar Kristjansson
Einar Kristjansson
Association footballers not categorized by position
Association football players not categorized by nationality
20th-century Icelandic people